Hot  Semurup is a hot spring attraction located in Air Panas Baru, Air Hangat, Kerinci Regency, Jambi, Indonesia.

The spring is heated by volcanic activity. The water is often steaming hot and smells sulfurous.

References

Landforms of Sumatra
Landforms of Jambi
Tourist attractions in Jambi
Hot springs of Indonesia
Volcanism of Indonesia